Live It Up is the twelfth album by the Isley Brothers, released on September 7, 1974. It was their second major-distributed album with Epic Records under their T-Neck subsidiary.

The album was remastered and expanded for inclusion in the 2015 released CD box set The RCA Victor & T-Neck Album Masters, 1959–1983.

Recording
Like their previous recording, their breakthrough 1973 album, 3 + 3, the album was assisted by the team of Malcolm Cecil and Robert Margouleff. The album also continued their growing trademark of funky dance songs mixed with softer soul ballads, which set the precedent for their landmark 1975 release, The Heat Is On.

Reception

The album spawned hit singles such as the title track, which topped at number eight on the US R&B charts, while another single, "Midnight Sky", was also a top ten R&B success, while both songs received some modest play on the pop and rock stations. The album's ballads including their slower rendition of Todd Rundgren's hit, "Hello It's Me", which was their only cover on the album, became popular alongside the folk rock influenced ballad, "Brown Eyed Girl".

The album track, "Need a Little Taste of Love", was later covered by The Doobie Brothers, while their version of "Hello It's Me" was covered by neo soul duo Groove Theory and was partially interpolated in Whitney Houston's single, "One of Those Days". Another track, "Ain't I Been Good to You", would be sampled by UGK on the track "One Day". On the album charts, Live It Up peaked at number 14 on the US pop albums chart and peaked at number-one on the R&B albums chart,  certified platinum by the Recording Industry Association of America (RIAA), selling a million copies, making it their first number-one R&B album ever in their career.

Track listing

Personnel
Ronald Isley –  lead vocals
O'Kelly Isley, Jr. –  background vocals
Rudolph Isley –  background vocals
Ernie Isley –  electric guitar, acoustic guitar, drums, percussion
Marvin Isley –  bass guitar
Chris Jasper –  electric piano, clavinet, ARP synthesizers, T.O.N.T.O., piano
George Moreland - drums
Karl Potter - percussion
Truman Thomas - organ

Charts

Singles

See also
List of number-one R&B albums of 1974 (U.S.)

References

External links
 The Isley Brothers-Live It Up at Discogs

1974 albums
The Isley Brothers albums
T-Neck Records albums